Miles Davis All Stars, Volume 1 (PRLP 196) is a 10 inch LP album by Miles Davis, released by Prestige Records. The two side-long tracks on this LP, and two others, were recorded at Rudy Van Gelder's Studio, Hackensack, New Jersey, on December 24, 1954. This was the first of two 10" LPs sourced from the same session, which featured vibraphonist Milt Jackson, pianist Thelonious Monk, bassist Percy Heath and drummer Kenny Clarke. Jackson, Heath and Clarke were three quarters of the Modern Jazz Quartet at this time.

After the 10" LP format was discontinued, the track "Bags' Groove" was reissued on side 1 of the 12" LP Bags' Groove (PRLP 7109), paired with an alternate take. "Swing Spring" would reappear on the 12" album Miles Davis and the Modern Jazz Giants (PRLP 7150), alongside the two other songs recorded at the same session.

Track listing

Personnel
 Miles Davis – Trumpet
 Milt Jackson – Vibraphone
 Thelonious Monk – Piano
 Percy Heath – Bass
 Kenny Clarke – Drums

References

1955 albums
Miles Davis albums
Prestige Records albums
Albums produced by Bob Weinstock
Albums recorded at Van Gelder Studio